Mariana Renata Dantec (born 31 December 1983, Paris), better known by Mariana Renata and Mariana Dantec, is a French-Indonesian model and actress. She is best known for her roles in the films Janji Joni (2005), The Matchmaker (2006), and Nic And Mar series (2015).

Early life and education
Born to a French father and an Indonesian mother, Dantec started her modeling career at the age of 13 in Jakarta, Indonesia. 

Dantec obtained an undergraduate degree in English Culture and Literature from the Paris-Sorbonne University and her Master of Commerce at the University of New South Wales in International Business.

Career
During her modeling career, Dantec has walked on the Paris, Sidney, Milan and New York fashion runways, and has become a model for numerous global brands

In addition to modelling career, Dantec has appeared in several music videos. In 2003, Dantec was featured in the Asian-market version of Josh Groban's She's Out of My Life and Indonesian-market version of Filipino band Rivermaya's Balisong music videos. The following year, Dantec was chosen as the new brand ambassador for Lux.

In 2005, Dantec landed her first film, taking a supporting role in Joko Anwar's romantic comedy Janji Joni. The film was screening at the 2005 Tokyo International Film Festival. She won Most Favorite Supporting Actress at the MTV Indonesia Movie Awards for her first performance in the film. Dantec next appeared as a cameo in the 2006 television series Dunia Tanpa Koma. That same year, Dantec took her first lead role as an eclectic girl who tries to pair off her best friend with a bookshop owner in a short film The Matchmaker, directed by Cinzia Puspita Rini and produced by Nia Dinata. The film had its international premiere at The 11th Busan International Film Festival in Asian Shorts segment. 

Dantec then took a break from acting to finish her master's degree at the University of New South Wales. After she graduated in 2010, Dantec settled in Australia and traveled to Central American countries for a year. 

Since 2011, Dantec has been residing in New York City where she is represented by Wilhelmina Models and Innovative Artists modeling agencies. 

Dantec then reunited with co-star Nicholas Saputra, eight years after Janji Joni, in a South Korean-Indonesian joint production film Someone’s Wife in the Boat of Someone’s Husband; a part of Jeonju International Film Festival's Jeonju Digital Project. The film was screening at the 2013 Locarno Film Festival, as well. 

In January 2014, Dantec became the guest judge in Asia's Next Top Model Season 2 where she was also introduced as the face of TRESemmé for South-east Asia region. The following year, Dantec for the third time acted opposite Nicholas Saputra in LINE's web series Nic And Mar. A story about rekindled lovers, it was released in March 2015 and aired weekly on Thursday and Friday through Line Story official account.

In 2016, Dantec participated in the International Labour Organization's campaign in promoting voluntary counselling and HIV testing for workers. She joined other artists and athletes around the world in the ILO’s “Voice of the Voiceless” initiative to give voice to people living with HIV/AIDS who are not able to tell their own stories. In the campaign video, Dantec lent her voice for the real-life story of Yohana, a plantation worker from Indonesia who found out she was HIV positive after getting tested at work. Dantec’s participation in this initiative was pro-bono. She noted, "Many people living with HIV have no access to information and to care as well as treatment. Even in many countries they lose their rights to employment".

Personal life
Dantec is the only child in the family. Her cousin, Renata Kusmanto, is a model and actress. Their mothers are twins. Her cousin-in-law, Fachri Albar, is an actor. Dantec speaks fluent Indonesian, English and French. 

From 2005 to 2006, Dantec was romantically linked to Janji Joni co-star Nicholas Saputra.

Filmography

Film

TV series

Reality show

Music video appearances

Awards and nominations

References

External links
 

1983 births
Indo people
Javanese people
French female models
French film actresses
Indonesian female models
Indonesian film actresses
French people of Chinese descent
French people of Dutch descent
French people of Indonesian descent
French people of Javanese descent
French people of Italian descent
French people of Jewish descent
Citizens of Indonesia through descent
Indonesian people of Chinese descent
Indonesian people of Dutch descent
Indonesian people of French descent
indonesian people of Italian descent
French emigrants to Indonesia
Indonesian people of Jewish descent
Indonesian people of French-Jewish descent
Living people
Actresses from Paris
University of Paris alumni